Bogdan Andrei Juratoni (born June 17, 1990 in Deva) is a Romanian boxer. Juratoni won the bronze medal at the 2011 World Amateur Boxing Championships in Baku and qualified for the 2012 Summer Olympics in London.

Career
Juratoni is former European Cadet finalist.

The 21-year-old Romanian captured the bronze medal in the 2011 World Amateur Boxing Championships from Baku causing two huge surprises. On his way to a medal, he eliminated Cuba's Olympic silver medallist Emilio Correa in a tightly fought contest 26:24 in the third round of the competition and the World Championships silver medallist boxer Andranik Hakobyan of Armenia in the quarterfinals before losing in the semi-final to eventual champion Evhen Khytrov.

At the 2012 Summer Olympics he lost his first bout to Abbos Atoev 10:12.

World Champs results 
2011
Defeated Matej Dujić (Croatia)) 28-11
Defeated Tibor Varga (Slovakia) 12-2
Defeated Emilio Correa (Cuba) 26-24
Defeated Andranik Hakobyan (Armenia) 21-17
Lost to Evhen Khytrov RSC

References

External links
 Profile on AIBA
2012 Romanian National Championships
2013 Romanian National Championships
2014 Romanian National Championships
2015 Romanian National Championships
2016 Romanian National Championships
2017 Romanian National Championships

1990 births
Living people

Middleweight boxers
People from Deva, Romania
Boxers at the 2012 Summer Olympics
Olympic boxers of Romania
Romanian male boxers
AIBA World Boxing Championships medalists